The Atatürk Swimming Complex is a swimming centre in Adana, featuring two outdoor olympic size swimming pools and an indoor semi-olympic swimming pool. The building was opened in 1936, and re-constructed in 2009 at a cost of 6.5 million TL. The complex was the venue of the Adana Demirspor waterpolo team.

Olympic length Atatürk swimming pool features:
 10-lane
 2.4 depth
 5.5m high 3-storey diving tower (with elevator)
 2200-seater Spectator Stands with Shelter

Olympic length outdoor 100.Yıl swimming pool features:
 10-lane
 2.4 depth
 Spectator Stands with Shelter

Semi-olympic length indoor swimming pool features:
5-lane
1.8m depth

In addition, the  fitness centre is equipped with cardiovascular conditioning equipment, strength training equipment, and free weights. The facility also includes two cafeterias, sauna and multi-purpose rooms.

External links
 Adana Youth Services and Sports Directorate

References

Sport venues in Adana
Swimming venues in Turkey
Olympic swimming venues
Event venues established in 1936
Things named after Mustafa Kemal Atatürk